USS Uncas has been the name of more than one United States Navy ship, and may refer to:

 , a steamer in commission from 1862 to 1863
 , later redesignated Ocean Tug No. 51, AT-51, and YT-110, an armed tug in commission from 1898 to 1922
 , later renamed USS SP-689, a patrol boat in commission from 1917 to 1918
 , a tug in commission from 1942 to 1946

United States Navy ship names